Ivy is a 2015 Turkish drama film written and directed by Turkish filmmaker Tolga Karaçelik. After premiering in-competition at the 2015 Sundance Film Festival in Utah, the film continued its festival circuit, screening at more than 30 international film festivals, including Toronto IFF, Karlovy Vary IFF, Sao Paulo IFF and Sydney FF. The film won four awards at the Antalya International Film Festival (previously known as Antalya Golden Orange Film Festival) including Best Film and Best Director, making Karacelik one of the youngest directors to ever receive the Golden Orange.

Cast
 Nadir Sarıbacak as Cenk
 Hakan Karsak as Nadir
 Kadir Çermik as Ismail
 Özgür Emre Yıldırım as Alper
 Osman Alkaş as Beybaba
 Seyithan Özdemir as Kürt

Critical reception
The film was met with widespread acclaim from international publications,  Nisimagazine, the official publication of NISI MASA - European Network of Young Cinema, wrote after seeing the film at Karlovy film Festival that it "displays narrative and visual mastery in exploring the decay of conventions of all kinds" In his piece for CineVue after the East End screening, Allie Gemmill says that Karacelik has the slow-burning psychological drama nailed down, with "the right mixture of character and world building, a solid if not deceptively simple premise and a large enough injection of tension to sustain a feature-length plot;" contending "This is a brilliant piece of filmmaking: quiet in tone but deeply unsettling and entirely engrossing." In his article What A Turkish Film Can Teach Us About American Fear for TIME magazine, Elliot Ackerman sees the universality of implementing fear as a way to control societal order. Less impressed reviews came from Variety's Dennis Harvey and Hollywood Reporter's Boyd Van Hoeij, who both commend the film for its strong performances, however finding it "more ambitious than controlled."

The film gained a cult following with the younger generation in Turkey, who appreciate the political allegory amidst the lack of criticism everyone is accustomed to, with the Cenk character being highly relatable for many.

Awards and nominations

Release
The film was released theatrically in Turkey on 4 December 2015. It earned a total of 259,281TL (€78,763) in Turkey, reaching an audience of 24,786.  The film was released on Netflix.

References

External links
 Official Site (Turkish)
 
 Sundance Institute 
 Cineuropa

2015 films
2015 drama films
Turkish drama films
2010s Turkish-language films